Treasure Beach (foaled 2008) is a British-bred, Irish-trained Thoroughbred racehorse and winner of the 2011 Irish Derby. He was ridden by Colm O'Donoghue and trained by Aidan O'Brien. In his previous race he ran a close second in the Epsom Derby.

References

External links
Racing Post Profile

2008 racehorse births
Racehorses bred in the United Kingdom
Racehorses trained in Ireland
Irish Classic Race winners
Thoroughbred family 21-a